The Dungeon is a 1980 role-playing game supplement published by Dimension Six.

Contents
The Dungeon is a set of interchangeable parts that gamers can use to build actual dungeon scenes for 25mm miniatures.

Reception
Steve Jackson reviewed The Dungeon in The Space Gamer No. 31. Jackson commented that "If you're a miniatures fan, you ought to look at these. The only real problem is that they're meant for a square-grid layout. If you use a hex-grid system like DragonQuest or TFT, The Dungeon will do you much less good."

References

Fantasy role-playing game supplements
Role-playing game mapping aids
Role-playing game supplements introduced in 1980